Cefpiramide is a third-generation cephalosporin antibiotic.

References

External links
 
 
 

Cephalosporin antibiotics
Tetrazoles
4-Pyridones